Jett Rocket is a platform video game developed by Shin'en Multimedia for the Wii's WiiWare service. It was released on June 28, 2010 in North America and in Europe on July 2, 2010 for 1000 Nintendo Points. On November 24, 2010, a demo of Jett Rocket was made available for free on the Wii Shop Channel.

Gameplay
The player takes on the role of the eponymous Jett Rocket, a planetary inspector who is tasked with stopping the Power Plant Posse (PPP) from polluting the Earthlike planet Yoroppa. The objective is to clear each stage within the planet's three areas: the lush and tropical Atoll, the glacial and snowy Northpole, and the toxic and junglelike Swamps. Within each stage lies a set number of solar cells, many of which are scattered about and some of which are hidden, that Jett must collect in order to unlock each stage and gain access to the subsequent areas. Additionally, Jett must defeat a general of the PPP at the end of each area. As with standard platforming games, Jett is capable of jumping, but can briefly hover when using his jet pack. Within certain stages, he can also paraglide as well as either ride a hoverboard or a jetboat. In addition, Jett can defeat enemies, clear obstacles and activate switches with his "Dash" attack, which can be executed by shaking the Wii Remote while he is standing (which sees him perform a somersaulting tackle) or after a jump (which sees him perform a diving hammer fist). The game also features an achievement system that can be completed either during or after completion of the main story.

Reception
Jett Rocket has been met with mostly positive reception. Cubed3 noted the game as "a clear contender for WiiWare Game of the Year, if not 2010's best Wii game in general". Wiiloveit.com spoke very highly of it as well, giving it a 28/30 and claiming that it "knocked Lostwinds off its high horse." However, it was commented that a Time Attack mode of some kind would add much replay value to the eventual sequel. Jett Rocket has received a Metacritic score of 70, indicating mixed or average reviews.

Sequel
A potential sequel was first mentioned in May 2011 and was later confirmed on December 13, 2011 as Jett Rocket Super Surf for the Nintendo 3DS eShop. On January 15, 2013, the sequel was renamed to Jett Rocket II: The Wrath of Taikai. After the game's website went live on March 1, screenshots of the game were released later that month and a teaser trailer for the game was uploaded on April 16. On May 1, Shin'en announced that the game would be delayed for a Q3 release in order to add additional 3D free-roaming levels while reiterating that the game would still run at 60 frames per second and also releasing more screenshots in August. After being submitted to the 3DS' eShop in late August, Jett Rocket II: The Wrath of Taikai was finally released on November 13. Jett Rocket II: The Wrath of Taikai has been met with mixed to positive reception, with Nintendo Life awarding it a 7/10 and praising it as "a game that, for the most part, is fun to play and nice to look at. It tries to deliver a varied gameplay experience, and although it isn’t too hot when it comes to the 3D levels and shallow mini-games, it makes up for this with tightly crafted 2D levels that can be deviously challenging" while stating that its "overall presentation comes off as generic and lacking in personality." Cubed3 echoed similar statements, stating that the sequel "continues its predecessor's line of top precision platforming and striking visuals, yet is not quite at the level of carving out a non-generic look of its own" and ultimately awarded it a 7/10. Overall, Jett Rocket II: The Wrath of Taikai has received a Metacritic score of 62, indicating mixed or average reviews.

References

External links
Official Jett Rocket website
Official Jett Rocket II: The Wrath of Taikai website

2010 video games
2013 video games
3D platform games
Video games developed in Germany
Wii-only games
WiiWare games
Nintendo 3DS eShop games
Wii games
Nintendo 3DS games
Single-player video games
Video games set on fictional planets